This list of Irish artists includes notable visual artists born or working mainly in Ireland along with a list of critics, collectors and curators who have had an influence on Irish visual arts.



A
Kevin Abosch (born 1969) – artist
Henry Allan (1865–1912) – painter
Mabel Annesley (1881–1959) – Anglo-Irish watercolourist and wood engraver
William Ashford (1746–1824) – British painter who worked exclusively in Ireland

B
Francis Bacon (1909–1992) – Irish painter
Robert Ballagh (born 1943) – artist
Robert Barker (1739–1806) – painter from Kells
George Barret, Sr. (1728–1784) – landscape artist, especially of portraits of the British countryside
James Barry (1741–1806)
William Gerard Barry (1864–1941) – painter
Rose Maynard Barton (1856–1929)
Mary Battersby (fl. 1801–1841)
Richard Brydges Beechey (1808–1895) – Anglo-Irish painter and Admiral in the Royal Navy
John Behan (born 1938) – sculptor
Shane Berkery (born 1992)
Pauline Bewick (born 1935) – artist
Renée Bickerstaff (1904–1983) – founding member & treasurer of the Ulster Society of Women Artists, & honorary secretary of the Royal Ulster Academy of Arts
Francis Bindon (1690–1765)
Basil Blackshaw (1932–2016) – painter, especially of rural scenes with greyhounds, Irish Travellers and the landscape
Brian Bourke (born 1936) – artist and winner of the Arts Council of Ireland award for portraiture
Alicia Boyle (1908–1997) – abstract landscapes
John Boyne (1750–1810)
Charles Brady (1926–1997) – New York-born painter who spent most of his life in Ireland
James Brenan (1837–1907) – artist
Gordon Brewster (1889–1946) – cartoonist
Deborah Brown (born 1927) – painting and sculpture
Vincent Browne (born 1947) – sculptor
Colleen Browning (1918–2003) – realist painter
Adam Buck (1759–1833)
Augustus Nicholas Burke (1838–1891) – artist and a member of the Royal Hibernian Academy
John Burke (1946–2006) – sculptor
Thomas Burke (1749–1815) – engraver and painter
Frederick William Burton (1816–1900) – painter born in Corofin, County Clare
Mildred Anne Butler (1885–1941) – painter
John Butts (c. 1728 – 1764)
John Byrne – contemporary artist
Gerard Byrne (born 1958) – figurative painter and en plein air landscape painter
Gerard Byrne (born 1969) – installation artist

C
Niccolo d'Ardia Caracciolo (1941–1989) – painter
Robert Carver (c. 1730 – 1791) – painter of theatre scenery and framed works
John Cassidy (1860–1939) – sculptor and painter
Anna Cheyne (1926–2002) –sculptor and painter
Alfred E. Child (1875–1939) – stained glass artist 
Harry Clarke (1889–1931) – stained glass artist and book illustrator
Anne Cleary (born 1965) – installation and video artist
Egerton Coghill (1853–1921) – painter, especially of landscapes of County Cork
James Coleman (born 1941) – installation and video artist
Charles Collins (c. 1680 – 1744) – painter, especially of animals and still-life
Patrick Collins (1910–1994) – painter
Fred Conlon (1943–2005) – sculptor
Denis Connolly (born 1965) – installation and video artist
William Conor (1881–1968)
Amanda Coogan (born 1971) – performance artist
Barrie Cooke (1931–2014) – abstract expressionist painter
Erin Corr (1793–1862) – engraver
James Humbert Craig (1878–1944)
Martin Cregan (1788–1870)
Frances Emilia Crofton (1822–1910) – landscape artist
Dorothy Cross (born 1956) – artist working in a range of media from sculpture to video
William Crozier (1930–2011) – Irish-Scots still-life and landscape artist
Amelia Curran (1775–1847) – portrait painter

D
Francis Danby (1793–1861) – painter, especially of large pictures in oil
Colin Davidson (born 1968) – artist
Gerald Davis (1938–2005)
William Davis (1812–1873) – artist influenced by the Pre-Raphaelite style of painting
Niall de Buitléar (born 1983)
Mary Eily de Putron (1914–1982) – Irish and Guernsey stained glass artist and archaeologist
Edward Delaney (1930–2009) – sculptor born in Claremorris
Vivienne Dick – experimental filmmaker
Gerald Dillon (1916–1971) – painter
Anne Donnelly (born 1932) – artist
Willie Doherty (born 1959) – artist mainly in photography and video
Keith Drury (artist) (born 1964) – oil painter and 3D digital artist
Susanna Drury (1698–1770) – landscape painter
Patrick Vincent Duffy (1836–1909) – painter, primarily of landscapes
Rita Duffy (born 1959) – painter

E
Ross Eccles (born 1937) – contemporary artist, English-born but based in Ireland since 1971
Felim Egan (born 1952) – painter
Frank Egginton (1908–1990) – contemporary painter
Alfred Elmore (1815–1881) – Victorian history and genre painter
Beatrice Elvery (1881–1970) – stained-glass artist and painter

F
Robert Fagan (1761–1816) – painter, diplomat and archaeologist
Gary Farrelly (born 1983) – artist and a founder of the Defastenist art group
Fergus Feehily (born 1968) – artist
Genieve Figgis (born 1972) – contemporary painter
Jonathan Fisher (fl. 1763–1809) – painter, engraver, and printmaker of aquatints of Irish scenery
Mary Fitzgerald (born 1956) – member of Aosdana, lives and works in Dublin and Co. Waterford
Jim Fitzpatrick (born 1944) – artist, especially of Irish Celtic art
T P Flanagan (1929–2011) – landscapes
John Henry Foley (1818–1874) – sculptor
Gerda Frömel (1931–1975) – sculptor
Stanhope Alexander Forbes (1857–1947) – artist and member of the Newlyn school of painters
Graham Forsythe (born 1952) – painter
Brian Frances (1933–2005) – landscape painter
Hugh Frazer (1795–1865) – painter
William Percy French (1854–1920) – songwriter, entertainer, watercolour painter

G
Norman Garstin (1847–1926) – artist with the Newlyn School of painters
Edmund Garvey (1740–1813) – painter
Wilhelmina Geddes (1887–1955)
William St. John Glenn (1904–1974)
W R Gordon (1872–1955) – landscapes, founding member of the Ulster Arts Club and the Ulster Literary Theatre
Eileen Gray (1879–1976) – furniture designer and architect
Anita Groener (born 1958) – artist and Aosdána member
Nathaniel Grogan (1740–1807) – painter from Cork

H
Willem Van der Hagen (unknown–1745) – Dutch-born landscape painter who settled in Ireland
Ronan Halpin (born 1958) – sculptor living on Achill Island, works in steel and bronze
Eva Henrietta Hamilton (1876–1960)
Hugh Douglas Hamilton (1734/1739–1808) 
Alice Berger Hammerschlag (1917–1969) 
James Hanley (born 1965)
Marie Hanlon (born 1948) – artist and Aosdána member
Alice Hanratty (born 1939) – printmaker
William Michael Harnett (1848–1892) – Irish-American painter who used a trompe-l'œil style of painting
Conor Harrington (born 1980) – Irish-born street artist based in London
William Harrington (Artist) (born 1941) – Irish artist noted for his drawings of Cork city people and streetscapes
Gertrude Hartland (1865–1954) – illustrator
Henry Albert Hartland (1840–1893) – illustrator and built theatrical scenery
Joseph Patrick Haverty (1794–1864) – painter
Edwin Hayes (1819–1904) – painter of naval and marine seascapes/landscapes
Gabriel Hayes (1909–1978) – artist and currency designer
Gottfried Helnwein (born 1948) – Austrian painter, photographer, installation and performance artist
Mercedes Helnwein (born 1979) – fine artist, writer, and video artist
Jeremy Henderson (1952–2009) – artist and painter
Patrick Hennessy (1915–1980) – realist painter
William John Hennessy (1839–1917) – wood carving and watercolor artist
Olive Henry (1902–1989) – painting, photography and stained glass artist
Paul Henry (1876–1958) – landscape painter
Mary Balfour Herbert (1817–1893) – watercolour artist, especially scenes from the Lakes of Killarney
Christopher Hewetson (1739–1799) – sculptor
Thomas Hickey (1741–1824) – painter
Derek Hill (1916–2000) – English-born portrait and landscape painter in Ireland
Nathaniel Hill (1861–1934) – impressionist
Sean Hillen (born 1961) – artist, especially of collages and the creative use of photographs
Nuala Holloway (born c. 1956) – painter
Katie Holten (born 1975) – artist of drawings, installations, sculptures, and public art projects
Evie Hone (1894–1955) – painter and stained glass artist
Nathaniel Hone the Elder (1718–1784) – portrait and miniature painter
Nathaniel Hone the Younger (1831–1917) – painter
Thomas Hovenden (1840–1895) – Irish-American artist, teacher, and painter, especially of realistic quiet family scenes and narrative subjects
Mercy Hunter (1910–1989) – painter, calligrapher and teacher
Robert Hunter (fl. 1752–1803)
Philip Hussey (c. 1713 – 1783) – portraitist and interiors painter

I
Charles Cromwell Ingham (1796–1863) – portrait painter
Patrick Ireland/Brian O'Doherty (born 1928) – sculptor, conceptual artist, and installation artist
Jaki Irvine (born 1966) – contemporary artist

J
Mainie Jellett (1897–1944) – abstract painter and founder of the Irish Exhibition of Living Art
Charles Jervas (1675–1739) – portrait painter, translator, and art collector
George W. Joy (1845–1925) – painter
Rachel Joynt (born 1966) – sculptor

K
Paul Kane (1810–1871)
Joseph Malachy Kavanagh (1856–1918)
Seán Keating (1889–1977)
Oisín Kelly (1915–1981)
Harry Kernoff (1900–1974)
John Kindness (born 1951)
Cecil King (1921–1986)
Kenneth King (1939–2019)
John Kingerlee (born 1936)
Graham Knuttel (born 1954)
Georgina Moutray Kyle (1865–1950) – watercolour and pastels

L
Charles Lamb (1893–1964) – portraits and landscape painter
Deborah Lambkin (born 1970)
Grania Langrishe (born 1934)
Diarmuid Larkin (1918–1989)
Seán Larkin (born 1949) – art curator and educationist
James Latham (c. 1696 – 1747)
John Lavery (1856–1941)
Louis le Brocquy (1916–2012)
William John Leech (1861–1968)
James Le Jeune (1910–1983) – portraits and landscapes
John Luke (1906–1975)
Sean Lynch (born 1978) – contemporary artist
Clíodhna Lyons – Irish cartoonist

M
Gladys Maccabe (1918–2018)
George Galway MacCann (1909–1967) – sculpture, painting
Patrick MacDowell (1799–1870)
Micheál MacLiammóir (1899–1978)
Daniel Maclise (1806–1870)
Henry MacManus (c. 1810 – 1878)
Anne Madden (born 1932)
Cecil Maguire (1930–2020) – painter
Alice Maher (born 1956)
Padraig Marrinan (1906–1975)
Fergus Martin (born 1955)
Violet McAdoo (1900–1961)
James McArdell (fl. 1728–1765)
Charles McAuley (1900–1999)
Sheila McClean (1932–2016)
Samuel McCloy (1831–1904)
Bryan McCormack (born 1972)
Niall McCormack (born 1960)
Siobhan McDonald
Norah McGuinness (1903–1980)
Edward McGuire (1932–1986)
Frank McKelvey (1895–1974)
James McKenna (1933–2000)
Cherith McKinstry (1928–1904)
Aloysius McVeigh (1923–2008)
Colin Middleton (1910–1983)
Nick Miller (born 1962) – London-born artist, painter, member of Aosdána
John Minihan (born 1946)
Crawford Mitchell (1908–1976) – wood-engraving, linocuts
Flora Mitchell (1890–1973)
Martin Mooney (born 1970)
Garret Morphey (c. 1650 – 1716)
George Morrison (1915–1993) – landscape painter and a founding member of the Ulster Watercolour Society
Albert Morrow (1863–1927) – illustrator, poster designer and cartoonist
Jack Morrow (1872–1926) – political cartoonist, illustrator and landscape painter
Richard Mosse (born 1980) – conceptual documentary photographer and video artist
Richard Moynan (1856–1906)
Michael Mulcahy (born 1952)
Janet Mullarney (1952–2020) – sculptor
George Mullins (fl. 1763–65)
William Mulready (1786–1863)
Bernard Mulrenin (1803–1868)
George Francis Mulvany (1809–1869)

N
Charles Wynne Nicholls (1831–1903)
Paul Nietsche (1885–1950) – portraits and still-life

O
Dermod O'Brien (1865–1945) – landscape and portrait painter
John O'Brien (1831–1891) – Irish-born Canadian marine artist
James Arthur O'Connor (1792–1841) – painter
John O'Connor (1830–1889) – painter
Roderic O'Conor (1860–1940) – painter influenced by Impressionism
Éamonn O'Doherty (1939–2011) – sculptor
John O'Keeffe (c. 1797 – 1838) – portrait and figure painter
Aloysius O'Kelly (1853 – c. 1941) – painter of coastlines, fishing ports and villages
Tony O'Malley (1913–2003) – self-taught painter
Frank O'Meara (1853–1888) – painter
Daniel O'Neill (1920–1974) – Romantic painter born in Belfast
George Bernard O'Neill (1828–1917) – paintings and etchings 
Henry O'Neill (1798–1880) – artist and archaeologist
William Orpen (1878–1931) – portrait painter
Dennis H Osborne (1919–2016) – painter
Jean Osborne (1926–1965) – abstract paintings and graphic designer
Walter Osborne (1859–1903) – impressionist painter
Seán O'Sullivan (1906–1964) – portrait painter
Rory O'Tunny (fl. 1540s) – sculptor

P
George Petrie (1790–1866) – painter, musician, antiquary and archaeologist
Stanley Pettigrew (born 1927) – painter
Garrett Phelan (born 1965) – installation artist
Raymond Piper (1923–2007) – portraiture and illustration
Albert Power (1881–1945) – sculptor
Sarah Purser (1848–1943) – artist often working in stained glass
Stephen Pusey (born 1952) – mural painter
Patrick Pye (1929–2018) – sculptor, painter and stained glass artist; resident in County Dublin

R
Basil Rakoczi (1908–1979) – artist and member of The White Stag group
John Ramage (1748–1802) – Irish American artist, goldsmith, portrait painter, and miniaturist
Eileen Reid (1894–1981) – painter
Nano Reid (1900–1981) – painter
Jim Ricks (born 1973) – contemporary artist
Anne Rigney (born 1957) – abstract artist and sculptor
Thomas Roberts (1749–1778) – landscape painter
Maria D. Robinson (1840–1920) – painter
Markey Robinson (1918–1999) – painter with a distinctive naïve expressionist style
Richard Rothwell (1800–1868) – portrait and genre painter
John Ryan (1925–1992) – artist, writer, critic, publisher, patron, broadcaster and publican

S
William Sadler II (c. 1782 – 1839) – landscape painter
Augustus Saint-Gaudens (1848–1907) – Irish-born American sculptor of the Beaux-Arts generation
Caroline Scally (1886–1973) – Irish landscape artist
Robert Richard Scanlan (1801–1876) – painter and portraitist
Patrick Scott (1921–2014) – artist
Sean Scully (born 1945) – Irish-born American painter and printmaker
Paul Seawright (born 1965) – artist and professor of photography at the University of Ulster
Dermot Seymour (Born 1956) – painter
Kevin Sharkey (born 1960) – painter and celebrity
Neil Shawcross (born 1940) – portrait painter
Sir Martin Archer Shee (1769–1850) – Dublin-born portrait painter and president of the Royal Academy
Oliver Sheppard (1865–1941) – sculptor and lecturer
John Shinnors (born 1950) – abstract painter
James Sleator (1889–1950) – artist
Bob Sloan (born 1940) – sculptor
Hamilton Sloan (born 1945) – portrait painter and traditional Irish artist
Victor Sloan (born 1945) – photographer and artist
Edward Smyth (1749–1812) – sculptor
Holly Somerville – botanical artist
Camille Souter (born 1929) – painter
Stella Steyn (1907–1987)
Imogen Stuart (born 1927) – Berlin-born sculptor
Patrick Swift (1927–1983)

T
Henry Jones Thaddeus (1859–1929) – realist and portrait painter 
Romeo Toogood (1902–1966) – landscape painter 
Henry Tresham (1750–1814) – Irish-born painter of large-scale history paintings
Patrick Tuohy (1894–1930) – portrait, narrative, and genre painter
Charles Tyrrell (born 1950) – abstract painter and printmaker

W
J. Laurie Wallace (1864–1953) – artist
Ciarán Walsh (born 1980) – artist
Owen Walsh (1933–2002) – painter
Samuel Walsh (born 1951) – contemporary abstract artist
Wendy F. Walsh (1915–2014) – illustrator and botanical artist
Michael Warren (born 1950) – sculptor
Una Watters (1918–1965) – artist
Robert West (died 1770) – painter
Leo Whelan (1852–1956) – painter
Maurice Canning Wilks (1911–1984)
Alexander Williams (1845–1930) – landscape painter, maritime scenes
William Gorman Wills (1828–1891) – dramatist and painter

Y
Anne Yeats (1919–2001) – painter and stage designer
Jack Yeats (1871–1957) – artist
John Butler Yeats (1839–1922) – artist

Critics, collectors and curators
Alfred Chester Beatty (1875–1968)
Alfred Lane Beit (1903–1994)
Thomas Bodkin (1887–1961)
Anne Crookshank (1927–2016)
William Dargan (1799–1867)
Desmond John Villiers FitzGerald, Knight of Glin (1937–2011)
Cathal Gannon (1910–1999)
Bryan Guinness (1905–1992)
John Hewitt (1907–1987)
Gordon Lambert (1919–2005)
Hugh Lane (1875–1915)
Denis Mahon (1910–2011)
Lochlann Quinn (born 1940)
Æ (George William Russell) (1867–1935)
Tony Ryan (1936–2007)
George Bernard Shaw (1856–1950)
Theo Snoddy (1922–2008)
Walter G. Strickland (1850–1928)
Dorothy Walker (1929–2002)

See also
List of Irish botanical illustrators
Irish art
List of Northern Irish artists

References

Irish artists
Artists